Ten Broadcasting Inc. (also referred to as X Broadcasting) is a privately held Canadian broadcasting and production company based in Ottawa, Ontario.

Operated channels
 Exxxtasy TV
 Penthouse TV
 Playmen TV
 Red Hot TV
 Skinemax HD

External links
 Official site
 CRTC chart of Ten Broadcasting assets

Mass media companies established in 2001
Entertainment companies established in 2001
Canadian companies established in 2001
Television broadcasting companies of Canada
Adult entertainment companies
Canadian pornographic film studios
Companies based in Ottawa